is a Japanese politician of the Liberal Democratic Party of Japan, a member of the House of Councillors in the Diet (national legislature). A native of Kumamoto, Kumamoto, he graduated from Tokyo Institute of Technology and received master's degrees from Massachusetts Institute of Technology and Harvard University in the United States. He was elected to the House of Councillors for the first time in 2004 when he left assistant professorship at the University of Tokyo.

References

External links 
  in Japanese.

1964 births
Living people
Members of the House of Councillors (Japan)
Massachusetts Institute of Technology alumni
Harvard University alumni
Academic staff of the University of Tokyo
People from Kumamoto
Democratic Party of Japan politicians
Tokyo Institute of Technology alumni